Pseudosagedia is a genus of corticolous (bark-dwelling) lichens in the family Trichotheliaceae. It was first circumscribed as a section of genus Arthopyrenia by Swiss botanist Johannes Müller Argoviensis in 1862. Maurice Choisy elevated it to distinct generic status in 1949. Pseudosagedia was little used until, in 1995, Josef Hafellner and Klaus Kalb resurrected the genus to contain members of the Porina nitidula species group with the perithecial pigment called Pseudosagedia-violet and lacking setae.

Species
, Species Fungorum (via the Catalog of Life) accepts 31 species of Pseudosagedia.
Pseudosagedia aenea 
Pseudosagedia atrocoerulea 
Pseudosagedia austriaca 
Pseudosagedia borreri 
Pseudosagedia cestrensis 
Pseudosagedia chlorotica 
Pseudosagedia corruscans 
Pseudosagedia crocynioides 
Pseudosagedia curnowii 
Pseudosagedia fallax 
Pseudosagedia ginzbergeri 
Pseudosagedia globulans 
Pseudosagedia grandis 
Pseudosagedia guentheri 
Pseudosagedia impressa 
Pseudosagedia interjungens 
Pseudosagedia isidiata 
Pseudosagedia laticarpa 
Pseudosagedia leptospora 
Pseudosagedia linearis 
Pseudosagedia lucens 
Pseudosagedia nitidula 
Pseudosagedia obsoleta 
Pseudosagedia oleriana 
Pseudosagedia papillifera 
Pseudosagedia rapaeformis 
Pseudosagedia rhaphidosperma 
Pseudosagedia thaxteri 
Pseudosagedia umbilicata 
Pseudosagedia whinrayi

References

Gyalectales
Lichen genera
Taxa described in 1862
Gyalectales genera
Taxa named by Johannes Müller Argoviensis